We Want Groove is the debut studio album by American jazz and funk group Rock Candy Funk Party. It was released on January 25, 2013 through J&R Adventures.

Track listing 
All tracks written by Tal Bergman / Joe Bonamassa / Ron DeJesus / Michael Merritt / Renato Neto unless indicated

References

2013 debut albums
Rock Candy Funk Party albums